Chapter 4 is the fourth album of South Korean pop music group g.o.d. It was released through Sidus and Yejeon Media on November 15, 2001. It was the group's second record to sell over 1 million copies.

Critical reception 
The album was not only popular and well received by fans, it was the group's most critically acclaimed album to date. It won the Daesang (Grand Prize) for the Album of the Year at the Golden Disc Awards, becoming only the second idol group to win one of the industry's most prestigious awards. 

Various reviews by major newspapers noted that the album displayed a more introspective and mature side of the group, with the album art likewise reflecting a more serious theme compared to that of the third album. The Korea JoongAng Daily concluded that "with R&B, hip-hop and ballads all blended together, the new release ought to satisfy the band's many fans."

Commercial performance
Chapter 4 sold 1,441,209 copies within a month of its release. Although the total sales figures dipped slightly compared to Chapter 3, Chapter 4 still currently holds the record for the best selling album (not including a repackaged edition) within a month in the history of the Recording Industry Association of Korea and its successor organizations, including the present-day Korea Music Content Industry Association which compiles data for the Gaon Music Chart.

Awards and nominations
"Road" and "The Place Where You Should Be" won successive "Triple Crowns" on Inkigayo and also ranked #1 on Music Camp (predecessor of Show! Music Core).

Track listing

Charts and sales

Monthly charts

Year-end charts

Sales

See also
List of best-selling albums in South Korea

References

External links
Album Information – Mnet 
Chapter 4 on iTunes

G.o.d albums
2001 albums
Korean-language albums
Grand Prize Golden Disc Award-winning albums